Alexander Edgardovich Barkov (born April 17, 1965) is a Russian former professional ice hockey player and coach. He played a long career for Sibir Novosibirsk and Spartak Moscow in the Soviet Union, and later for Tappara of the Finnish SM-liiga. His son Aleksander Barkov Jr. was born in Finland and is the captain of the Florida Panthers of the NHL.

Career statistics

Regular season and playoffs

International

References

External links

1965 births
Living people
HC Sibir Novosibirsk players
Tappara players
Sportspeople from Novosibirsk
Russian ice hockey centres